Sean Burke (born January 29, 1967) is a Canadian former professional ice hockey goaltender and the current director of goaltending for the Vegas Golden Knights. He played 18 seasons in the National Hockey League (NHL) for the New Jersey Devils, Hartford Whalers, Carolina Hurricanes, Vancouver Canucks, Philadelphia Flyers, Florida Panthers, Phoenix Coyotes, Tampa Bay Lightning and Los Angeles Kings between 1988 and 2007. He was born in Windsor, Ontario, but grew up in Toronto, Ontario.

Playing career
As a youth, Burke played in the 1980 Quebec International Pee-Wee Hockey Tournament with the St. Michael's minor ice hockey team from Toronto.

Burke attended St. Michael's college high school and played junior B hockey for the St.Michael's Buzzers in the 1983-84 season. He was taken in the 3rd round of the OHL draft by the Toronto Marlboros where he would play for the next two seasons. 

Burke was drafted by the New Jersey Devils in the second round of the 1985 NHL Entry Draft. He earned national attention from his international play, backstopping the Canada men's national junior ice hockey team to a silver medal in the 1986 World Junior Ice Hockey Championships and a fourth-place finish for the men's national team at the 1988 Winter Olympics in Calgary.

Burke transitioned directly from Canada's Olympics national team to the Devils. He started 11 games for the Devils in the 1987–88 season, including an overtime victory against the Chicago Blackhawks on the final night of the season that qualified the Devils for their first Stanley Cup playoff series.

Dubbed a "rookie sensation", Burke helped the Devils go on a strong playoff run, defeating the division-leader New York Islanders in the first round in six games and then the Washington Capitals in seven games. The Devils were one game away from the Stanley Cup Finals but lost in Game 7 of the Wales Conference Finals to the Boston Bruins. Burke's play was widely heralded, with The Hockey Digest stating, "Burke is now the franchise for the Devils, and to whatever heights he rises, the Devils will rise with him," and in December 1988, Burke became the first Devil to appear on its cover.

Because he played just 11 games in the 1987–88 regular season, Burke maintained his rookie status for the 1988–89 season. That season, he was named to the 1989 All-Star Game.

Burke played for the Devils through the 1990–91 season, then sat out the 1991–92 season requesting a trade.  Instead, he joined coach Dave King and  played for the Canadian national team in the Winter Olympics for a second time, backstopping Canada to a silver medal. Teammates on the 1992 Olympic team included future NHL players Eric Lindros and Joe Juneau. 

On August 28, 1992, Burke was traded to the Hartford Whalers in exchange for Bobby Holík, a second-round pick in the 1993 NHL Entry Draft (used to select Jay Pandolfo) and future considerations. He played there (and with the relocated Whalers team, the Carolina Hurricanes) for six seasons. He was voted Whalers' team MVP from 1993 to 1997. Burke then played with several teams, including the Philadelphia Flyers, Vancouver Canucks and Florida Panthers. He subsequently signed with the Phoenix Coyotes and played there for five seasons, where he was a finalist for the Vezina Trophy and third finalist for the Hart Memorial Trophy in the 2001–02 season.

Burke was selected to represent the Arizona Coyotes in the 2000-01 and 2001-02 NHL All Star games. 

After that, Burke played for the Philadelphia Flyers (for the second time) recording his 300th career NHL win (the 20th goaltender to reach this milestone), and the Tampa Bay Lightning. Burke was placed on waivers by Tampa Bay before the 2006–07 season but was not picked up. He then played for Tampa Bay's American Hockey League (AHL) affiliate, the Springfield Falcons.  Burke was placed on waivers by the Lightning and picked up off re-entry waivers by the Los Angeles Kings.

Burke announced his retirement from professional hockey on September 18, 2007.
Burke currently sits #15 on the list of all time games played for NHL goaltenders (820) #30 all time wins (324) #50 all time shutouts (38) and #5 all time penalty minutes for goaltenders (310)

International play

Burke played in 11 games for the Canadian national team in the 1988 and 1992 Winter Olympics. He served as the back-up goaltender in the 1991 Canada Cup and has also played in 130 games for other Canadian national teams from 1985 through 2003.

The 130 games that Burke has played for Team Canada represent the most games any goaltender has  played Internationally for Canada 

In 2020, Burke was named into the IIHF All-Time Canada Team along with Scott Niedermayer, Chris Pronger, Wayne Gretzky, Mario Lemieux and Sidney Crosby.

Post-NHL career
On March 4, 2008, the Phoenix Coyotes hired Burke to become its director of prospect development. He was also the assistant to the general manager and Coyotes' goaltending coach.

In 2015 Burke was part of the management group along with General Manager Jim Nill, George McPhee and Pat Verbeek that led Canada to a gold medal at the IIHF World Championships. Canada went undefeated in the tournament held in Prague, Czech Republic beating Russia 6 t0 1 in the gold medal game. 

In 2016 Burke joined General Managers Brad Treliving and George McPhee as part of the management group for the IIHF World Championships in Moscow and Saint Petersburg, Russia. Canada won the gold medal defeating Finland 2 to 0 in the final game. 

In 2017 Burke co managed Team Canada at the IIHF World Championships along with Ron Hextall in Cologne, Germany and Paris, France. Canada took home the silver medal after been defeated 2 to 1 in a shootout by Sweden. 

Burke was the General Manager for Team Canada at the Spengler Cup in  2016, 2017 and 2019 taking home gold medals. In 2018 he managed the team along with Ron Francis taking home the silver medal. 

In September 2016, Burke joined the Montreal Canadiens as a professional scout. He also spent the 2020-21 season as the full time goaltending coach with the Canadiens as the team made it to the Stanley Cup finals losing to the Tampa Bay Lightning in 5 games. On July 25, 2017, he was announced as the general manager of Canada's men's team for the 2018 Winter Olympics in Pyeongchang.
where Team Canada went on to win the bronze medal. That same season he co managed the IIHF World Championships with Martin Brodeur and Scott Salmond held in Copenhagen and Herning, Denmark. 

In March 2021, Burke was appointed as the director of goaltending for the Montreal Canadiens.

On June 25, 2022, Burke was appointed as director of goaltending for the Vegas Golden Knights

Burke is a member of the International Ice Hockey Federations Players Committee where he has served on the committee since 2016.

Personal life
Burke and his wife Christy gave birth to their first son Hudson on April 9, 2015. They currently reside in Las Vegas, Nevada

Burke has a step daughter Alexis that lives in Scottsdale, Arizona and a step son Jimmy that resides in Huntington Beach, California.

He also has two children from his first marriage. Daughter Andie lives in Calgary, Alberta Canada and son Brendan lives in Scottsdale, Arizona. Brendan was drafted as a goaltender in the 2013 NHL entry draft by the Arizona Coyotes.

Career statistics

Regular season and playoffs

International

Awards and achievements

References

External links
 

1967 births
Arizona Coyotes coaches
Arizona Coyotes executives
Canadian ice hockey coaches
Canadian ice hockey goaltenders
Carolina Hurricanes players
Florida Panthers players
Hartford Whalers players
Ice hockey people from Ontario
Ice hockey players at the 1988 Winter Olympics
Ice hockey players at the 1992 Winter Olympics
Living people
Los Angeles Kings players
Medalists at the 1992 Winter Olympics
Montreal Canadiens scouts
National Hockey League All-Stars
New Jersey Devils draft picks
New Jersey Devils players
Olympic ice hockey players of Canada
Olympic medalists in ice hockey
Olympic silver medalists for Canada
Philadelphia Flyers players
Phoenix Coyotes players
San Diego Gulls (IHL) players
Sportspeople from Windsor, Ontario
Springfield Falcons players
Tampa Bay Lightning players
Toronto Marlboros players
Vancouver Canucks players
Vegas Golden Knights coaches